The 2016 Trophée des Alpilles is a professional tennis tournament played on hard courts. It is the eighth edition of the tournament which is part of the 2016 ATP Challenger Tour. It was held in Saint-Rémy-de-Provence, France between 6 and 11 September 2016.

Singles main-draw entrants

Seeds

 1 Rankings are as of August 29, 2016.

Other entrants
The following players received wildcards into the singles main draw:
  Maxime Janvier
  Matthias Bachinger
  Alexandre Müller
  Laurent Lokoli

The following player received entry as an alternate:
  Ante Pavić

The following players received entry from the qualifying draw:
  Erik Crepaldi
  Albano Olivetti
  Romain Jouan
  Hugo Grenier

Champions

Singles

 Daniil Medvedev def.   Joris De Loore, 6–3, 6–3.

Doubles

 Ken Skupski /  Neal Skupski def.  David O'Hare /  Joe Salisbury, 6–7(5–7), 6–4, [10–5].

External links
Official website

References

Trophee des Alpilles
Trophée des Alpilles
Trophee des Alpilles